Mein Schiff (German, 'My Ship') may refer to the following ships:

 Marella Explorer, formerly Mein Schiff and later Mein Schiff 1
 Mein Schiff 1, the name of two ships
 Mein Schiff 2, the name of two ships
 Mein Schiff 3
 Mein Schiff 4
 Mein Schiff 5
 Mein Schiff 6
 Mein Schiff Herz

See also
 TUI Cruises#Fleet